This article provides a list of active citizen-organized environmental community organizations that serve particular cities, towns, unincorporated area, and similar jurisdictions or regions in the United States and worldwide. Locations are listed in alphabetical order by state with associated organizations included in the line entry.

Greece

Kalamos Island Kastos Island, Terra Sylvestris (http://www.terrasylvestris.org)

Australia
 Melbourne, Sustainable Melbourne (http://www.sustainablemelbourne.com)

United States

Alabama

Alaska

Arizona

Arkansas

California
 Burlingame, Citizens Environmental Council Burlingame (http://www.burlingamecec.org)
 Cupertino, South Bay/Peninsula Simplicity Circle (https://groups.yahoo.com/group/SimpleLiving-SFSouthBayPen/)
 Lake Tahoe, League to Save Lake Tahoe (https://keeptahoeblue.org/)
 Los Altos, Los Altos Green Ribbon Citizens Committee (http://www.greentownlosaltos.org)
 Marin County, Salmon Protection and Watershed Network (SPAWN) (https://seaturtles.org/programs/salmon/); Sustainable Marin (http://www.sustainablemarin.org); Sustainable Fairfax (http://www.SustainableFairfax.org); Sustainable Novato (http://www.SustainableNovato.org); Sustainable San Rafael (http://www.Sustainablesanrafael.org); Sustainable San Anselmo, Sustainable Mill Valley
 Menlo Park, Menlo Park Green Ribbon Citizens Committee (http://www.menlogreen.typepad.com)
 Mountain View, Mountain View Coalition for Sustainable Planning (https://web.archive.org/web/20110714184131/http://mtnviewcsp.ning.com/); Carbon Free Mountain View (http://www.carbonfreemountainview.org/); Mountain View Cool Cities (http://www.coolcities.us/cityProfiles.php?city=132&state=CA)
 Palo Alto, Community Environmental Action Partnership (http://pa-ceap.pbwiki.com); Acterra: Action for a Sustainable Earth (http://www.acterra.org)
 San Jose, San Jose Cool Cities Team (http://www.coolcities.us/cityProfiles.php?city=171&state=CA)
 Santa Clara County, Silicon Valley Youth Climate Action (https://www.youthclimateaction.com/)
 Sierra Nevada, Foothills Water Network (http://foothillswaternetwork.org/); Sierra Fund (https://www.sierrafund.org/); Sierra Nevada Alliance (http://sierranevadaalliance.com/); Sierra Streams Institute (https://sierrastreamsinstitute.org/)
 Sunnyvale, Sunnyvale Cool Cities (https://web.archive.org/web/20160306203741/http://sunnyvalecool.org/); Livable Sunnyvale (http://www.livablesunnyvale.org)
 Truckee, Mountain Area Preservation Foundation (MAP) (https://mapf.org/)
 Yuba River watershed, South Yuba River Citizens League (SYRCL) (https://yubariver.org/)

Colorado

Connecticut

Delaware

Florida
 Conservation Corps of the Forgotten and Emerald Coasts, Florida Panhandle

Georgia

Hawai'i
 Hawaii County and Maui County, Deep Green Resistance Hawai'i (http://deepgreenresistancehawaii.org)

Idaho

Illinois
 Chicago, Deep Green Resistance Chicago (http://chicago.deepgreenresistance.org)

Indiana

Iowa

Kansas

Kentucky

Louisiana

Maine
 Rockland, Friends of Penobscot Bay (http://www.penbay.net)

Maryland

The Dirty Hands Club -DHC

Massachusetts

Michigan

Minnesota

Mississippi

Missouri

Montana
 Anaconda, Arrowhead Foundation (http://www.anacondasuperfund.org/)
 Butte, Citizens Technical Environmental Committee (CTEC) (http://www.buttectec.org/)
 Deer Lodge, Clark Fork River Technical Assistance Committee (CFRTAC) (http://www.cfrtac.org/)

Nebraska

Nevada

New Hampshire

New Jersey

New Mexico

New York
 New York City, Deep Green Resistance New York (http://deepgreenresistancenewyork.wordpress.com/)

North Carolina
Chapel Hill, Student Environmental Education Coalition (www.ncseec.org)

North Dakota

Ohio
Cincinnati, Imago Earth; Groundwork Cincinnati - Mill Creek

Oklahoma

Oregon
 Eugene, Deep Green Resistance Eugene (https://www.facebook.com/DGREugene)

Pennsylvania

Rhode Island

South Carolina

South Dakota

Tennessee

Texas

Utah
{Conserve Southwest Utah 321 N Mall Dr B202, St. George, UT 84790 (513) 817-1128 https://conserveswu.org}

Vermont

Virginia

Washington
 Seattle, Deep Green Resistance Seattle (http://deepgreenresistanceseattle.org)

Washington, D.C.

West Virginia

Wisconsin

Wyoming